Internet in Brazil was launched in 1988. In 2011 Brazil ranked fifth in the world with nearly 89 million Internet users, 45% of the population.  In March 2022, Brazil ranked 33rd in the Ookla Broadband Ranking (fixed broadband), with a median fixed broadband speed of 90 Mbit/s. Also, as per December 2021, Brazil had 41,4 million fixed broadband accesses, most of them FTTH. However, as per 2020, most Brazilians access the Internet through a mobile connection, with more than 200 million mobile internet access (104 accesses/100 inhabitants).

History
In 1988 the National Research Network (RNP), was formed by the academic communities of Rio de Janeiro and São Paulo. Since its beginnings, including its introduction to the general public in 1995, the Brazilian Internet depended strongly on efforts led by the Federal Government through the Ministry of Communications, the state-owned communications company Embratel and its holding, Telebras.

This changed in 1998, as a result of the privatization of Telebras, and the blossoming of private companies, such as Telefónica, Telemar and Brasil Telecom. With the surge of competition for customers, coupled with government-imposed requirements, came improvements in cost, quality, and availability of the Internet to Brazilians.

ADSL was successful in Brazil during beta testing and became popular in early 2000's , being offered by Telefónica (Speedy), Brasil Telecom (Turbo), NET (Virtua), and Telemar (Velox) with typical speeds of around 256 kbit/s down and 128 kbit/s up when introduced. Broadband access is split between ADSL, cable modem, satellite, VDSL, VDSL2, FTTH, and wireless Internet service providers (often called 'radio internet'), with the first WiFi services appearing in 2004.

During the first decade of the 21st century, limited availability of high-speed Internet in Brazil was a major problem, especially in rural regions. Accordingly, the Brazilian government pressured providers to broaden supply in outlying areas. Wireless LAN ISPs are becoming more common in the interior of the country. In large cities some WiFi hotspots are also available.

By November 2005, some cable companies were offering 2, 4, and 8 Mbit/s access for the same price as 512 kbit/s ADSL connections.

In April 2008 the Broadband in Schools program was launched to benefit 37 million students by bringing high speed Internet access to 64,879 urban public schools by the end of 2010.

In 2009 a lack of sufficient infrastructure for the Telefônica (Speedy) ISP led to periodic service failures in some areas. Sales were suspended by the Brazilian Agency of Telecommunications (ANATEL) until a process of major infrastructure expansion and rejuvenation was completed.

In 2010, broadband Internet access was available in 88% of Brazilian cities, surpassing all expectations for its expansion. By 2016, it was expected that the Internet will have 57% of penetration in Brazil; by 2017 this value has risen to 64,7%.

In 2016 and 2017, major internet providers announced their interest in introducing data caps, a decision that was met with major backlash; for the time being, the Brazilian Agency of Telecommunications has not allowed this and "does not plan to reopen the debate on fixed broadband caps" 

In 2020, there were statistics that showed that 58% of the country population access the Internet solely through their smartphone, a number even higher in the lower income classes.

Use
Brazil uses the .br top level domain, which is managed by the Brazilian Internet Steering Committee. In 2011 Brazil ranked fourth in the world with 23,456,00 Internet hosts. In April 2012 Brazil was 10th in the world with 48,572,160 IPv4 addresses allocated, 23.6 per 100 residents.

The Internet is a popular medium for citizen–government interaction. For example, as per 2009, 99% of all income tax forms were delivered online.

Some of the most popular websites are web portals, such as Globo.com, UOL and iG; search engines, including Google and Yahoo; and social network services, the most important of which, by far, is Facebook. Due to the popularity of virtual communications, Newsweek referred to Brazil as the "Schmooze Nation". 
In 2

Fiber to the premises
 Telefónica launched, in São Paulo, its FTTH service in 3Q 2007 with initial speeds of 30, 60, and 100 Mbit/s downstream, and 5 Mbit/s upstream. Also available is an IPTV on-demand service and a convergent POTS and mobile pack. In June 2007 Telefónica was reported to have fibre coverage of a potential 400,000 households with 20,000 signed up for service.  From 2012 on, it adopted the brand "Vivo Fibra" for its FTTH broadband services. In 4Q2021 the company reported having 4.6 million homes connected with FTTH in the country.
The service is now marketed in all Brazilian states. Oi is now offering its own FTTH operation, in its original service area and recently started in a few cities in the state of São Paulo. Oi claimed to have 3,2 million homes connected with FTTH in 3Q2021 in its investor relation site 
 Global Village Telecom (GVT) launched, in August 2009, FTTH service in 56 cities, including the major markets of Porto Alegre, Curitiba, Belo Horizonte, and Salvador. GVT offer speeds up to 100 Mbit/s downstream and 10 Mbit/s upstream. In October 2010 GVT reported a broadband subscriber base of one million users, around 60% of whom are hooked up to 10Mbit/s or higher Internet connection. GVT was acquired by Telefónica in 2014.
 Claro (belonging to Mexican telecommunication corporation America Móvil) acquired Net Serviços de Comunicações, which provided Cable TV services in big and medium cities in Brazil. With a (HFC) network, they have been delivering speeds of up to 1 Gbps. Since 2019, new network installs are being done using fiber; as of 2022, however, the company does not plan to discontinue the existing HFC network, which has about 9 million users.
 Many ISPs are deploying FTTH service, either as completely new covered areas or to replace HFC or ADSL. In November/2021 they account for more than 57% of all FTTH accesses in Brazil.

Network neutrality

The Brazilian Civil Rights Framework for the Internet (in Portuguese: Marco Civil da Internet, officially Law No 12.965) became law on  April 23, 2014, at the Global Multistakeholder Meeting on the Future of Internet Governance. It governs the use of the Internet in Brazil, through forecasting principles, guarantees, rights and duties to those who use the network as well as the determination of guidelines for state action.

Brazilian Internet phenomenon
The Brazilian Internet phenomenon is the massive adoption by Brazilians of an Internet service, exceeding the number of other  nationalities using the service. A possible reason for this is shown on an IBOPE/NetRatings study that revealed that they overtook the U.S. in terms of time surfing on the internet and, as of 2004, were the people who spent the most time on the internet. This influx coincides with online aggression.

This phenomenon was clearly observed in 2003 on Fotolog.net (now Fotolog.com), when the number of Brazilians exceeded the number of users of all the other countries combined. The potential of the market of digital cameras was noticed as a result of this Fotolog.net mania. Such phenomenon happened with extreme rapidity in Google's social networking site Orkut. However, since it is common to find a person with multiple social network profiles, blogs and flogs or even fake registrations in these, statistics about which country has the most users may not always be reliable. On the other hand, a rumor (denied by Google) spread in Brazil claimed that Orkut users declaring themselves as being from this country could receive inferior services, leading many to register themselves as inhabitants of other countries. Thus, the percentage of Brazilians on these websites might be even higher.

In the 2000s, Brazil was also home to the highest number of MSN Messenger users, an instant messaging program that was very popular among teenagers. They have always adopted in great numbers such services as ICQ, IRC (BRASnet being one of the biggest IRC networks in the world), Gmail, Skype, Blogspot (Blogger released a service located in Brazil), and some defunct services like The Palace, Gooey and PowWow (chat program).

This probably explains why MSN Brasil and Yahoo! Brasil were relatively popular (in the 2000s), and may have contributed to AOL's failure in the Brazilian market, while UOL ranks highly in Alexa.

See also

 .br top level domain
 Brazilian Internet Phenomenon
 Internet censorship in Brazil
 List of countries by number of Internet users
 List of countries by number of Internet hosts
 List of countries by number of broadband Internet subscriptions
 List of internet service providers in Brazil

References

External links
Brazilian Internet Steering Committee (CGI.br), official web site
Brazilian top sites according to Alexa 

 
Communications in Brazil